The Grammy Award for Best Tejano Album was awarded from 1999 to 2011. In its first year the award was titled Best Tejano Music Performance and in 2000 it was awarded as Best Tejano Performance.  The current title has been used since 2001.  From 1993 to 1998 Tejano was included in the award for Best Mexican-American/Tejano Music Performance.

The award was discontinued from 2012 in a major overhaul of Grammy categories. From 2012, this category and  Best Regional Mexican Album merged to form the Best Regional Mexican or Tejano Album  category.

Years reflect the year in which the Grammy Awards were presented, for works released in the previous year.

Recipients

References

Tejano Album
Tejano music
.
Tejano Album
Tejano album
Awards established in 1999
Awards disestablished in 2011
1999 establishments in the United States
Album awards